Richard Kell may refer to:

 Richard Kell (footballer) (born 1979), English footballer
 Richard Kell (poet) (1927–2023), Irish poet